Richard L. Bloch (June 12, 1929 – October 27, 2018) was an American investor, real estate developer, banker, and philanthropist.

Biography

Early life
Richard L. Bloch was born on June 12, 1929 in Pontiac, Michigan.
 He graduated from the University of Chicago in Chicago, Illinois with a Bachelor of Science degree in 1949. He then attended graduate school at the University of Arizona in Tucson, Arizona from 1950 to 1952. Meanwhile, he also served in the Anti-Aircraft Artillery of the United States Army during the Korean War from 1951 to 1953, retiring as a first lieutenant.

Career
In 1957, he founded a real estate development company in California and Arizona. He co-developed and owned the Gulf & Western Building in New York City, a Hyatt Hotel in Los Angeles, California, the Transamerica Building in Tucson, Arizona. Additionally, he owned buildings used by IBM and Allstate Insurance. He served as the Chairman of the Board of Trust Managers of Columbus Realty Trust.

He became President and majority owner of the Phoenix Suns, an NBA basketball team, in 1968. He served as Chairman of the Board of Governors of the National Basketball Association. In 1973, he purchased KVOA, a television station in Tucson, Arizona affiliated with NBC. He was also co-owner of KNYN and KTMN, two radio stations based in Santa Fe, New Mexico. From 1976 to 1982, he served as the Chief Executive Officer of Filmways, including its subsidiaries, Union Fidelity Insurance and Grosset & Dunlap.

He served on the Board of Directors of Glenayre Technology (previously known as Nu-West) from 1987 to 1992, the Data Broadcasting Corporation from 1993 to 1995 and Ascendant Solutions from March 2002 to February 16, 2005. In 1997, he co-founded CLB Partners, and served as its co-manager. He served on the Board of Directors of City National Bank, headquartered in Beverly Hills, California, beginning in 1979.

He was a major donor to Democratic candidates. During the tenure of President Bill Clinton, he served on the President's Foreign Intelligence Advisory Board.

Philanthropy
He is a former trustee of the American Film Institute and the Museum of New Mexico Foundation. He served on the Boards of Trustees of the American Grand Prix Association, the United States Equestrian Team, the American Ballet Theatre in New York City, St. Vincent's Hospital in Santa Fe, New Mexico, the La Jolla Playhouse in La Jolla near San Diego.

Personal life
He was married to Nancy Bloch. He had been the owner of Pinon Farm in Santa Fe, New Mexico since 1982. Bloch died on October 27, 2018 at the age of 89 after a fall.

References

1929 births
2018 deaths
American investors
American corporate directors
Phoenix Suns executives
Phoenix Suns owners
United States Army personnel of the Korean War
People from Pontiac, Michigan
People from Santa Fe, New Mexico
Military personnel from Michigan
University of Chicago alumni
University of Arizona alumni
20th-century American philanthropists
United States Army officers
Deaths from falls